Chirala Municipality is the local self-government in Chirala, a city in the Indian state of Andhra Pradesh. It is classified as a first grade municipality.

Administration 
The municipality was constituted on 1 April 1948. The Elected Wing of the municipality consists of a municipal council, which has elected members and is headed by a Chairperson. Whereas, the  Executive Wing is headed by a municipal commissioner. The present municipal commissioner of the city is Ch.Malleswara Rao

Civic works and services 
Most of the city residents rely on public taps for water. A total of 6 MLD (million liters per day) of drinking water is supplied every day.

The infrastructure maintained by the municipality covers, street lights, public markets, shopping complexes and community halls etc., and recreational areas like, public parks, playgrounds etc. There are educational institutions like elementary and secondary schools imparting for primary and secondary. including junior colleges. For public health, the municipality has dispensaries, maternity and child health centers.

See also 
 List of municipalities in Andhra Pradesh

References 

1948 establishments in India
Government agencies established in 1948
Urban local bodies in Andhra Pradesh